Józef Rufin Wybicki (29 September 1747 – 10 March 1822) was a Polish nobleman, jurist, poet, political and military activist of Kashubian descent.

Life

Wybicki was born in Będomin, in the region of Pomerania in the Polish–Lithuanian Commonwealth. His family was Pomeranian nobility.

He finished a Jesuit school, and in his youth was a junior court official. In 1767, he worked at the Crown Tribunal in Bydgoszcz. Wybicki was elected a deputy to the Repnin Sejm, the session of Polish parliament in 1767, on the eve of the First Partition of Poland. Subsequently he joined the insurgency known as the Confederation of Bar (1768–1772), aimed at opposing the Russian influence and king Stanisław August Poniatowski. He was one of the advisors (konsyliarz) of the Confederacy, acting as a diplomat. After the failure of the uprising, he spent some time in the Netherlands, studying law at Leiden University.

Returning to Poland, in the 1770s and 1780s he was associated with the Commission of National Education. He supported King Stanisław August Poniatowski and his proposed reforms. He helped draft the liberal Zamoyski Codex of laws of the late 1770s. He was a Patriotic Party activist during the Great Sejm (1788–92) – though he was not one of its first deputies, during much of that time staying at his estate, writing and staging operas. He did, however, participate in the Great Sejm's deliberations, beginning in 1791. In 1792, in the aftermath of the Polish–Russian War of 1792, like many of Poniatowski's supporters, he joined the Targowica Confederation.

He participated in the Kościuszko Uprising (1794) and was a member of the Military Section of the Provisional Council of the Duchy of Masovia. During the uprising, he co-organized the Polish administration in the liberated city of Bydgoszcz. After the failure of this insurrection he moved to France.

He was a close friend of both Tadeusz Kościuszko and Jan Henryk Dąbrowski. With Dąbrowski he organized the Polish Legions in Italy, serving under Napoleon Bonaparte. In 1797, while in Reggio Emilia, Italy, he wrote Mazurek Dąbrowskiego (Dąbrowski's Mazurek). In 1806 he helped Dąbrowski organize the Greater Poland Uprising.

After the creation of the Duchy of Warsaw in 1807, he held a number of positions in its Department of Justice, and continued working for it after the Duchy's transformation into Congress Poland. In 1817 he became president of the Supreme Court of Congress Poland.

He died on 10 March 1822 in Manieczki, then part of the Grand Duchy of Posen in the Prussian Partition of Poland.

Works
Wybicki was a writer, journalist and a poet. He wrote political-themed poems, plays and political treaties advocating reforms in Poland in the 1770s and 1780s. His works of that time analyzed the Polish political system, the concepts of liberty, and advocated for more rights for the peasantry. He would also publish more political brochures in the 1800s, advocating for liberal reforms in the Duchy of Warsaw.

Mazurek Dąbrowskiego (Dąbrowski's Mazurka) remains Wybicki's most famous creation. It has been regarded as an unofficial national anthem since the November Uprising of 1831. In 1927 the Mazurka was officially adopted as the Polish national anthem by the Polish parliament (Sejm).

See also
 Enlightenment in Poland

References

External links

 Biography at univ.gda.pl
 Memoirs of Józef Wybicki
 

1747 births
1822 deaths
People from Kościerzyna County
18th-century Polish–Lithuanian lawyers
Age of Enlightenment
National anthem writers
Kościuszko insurgents
Senators of Congress Poland
Senators of the Duchy of Warsaw
Members of the Sejm of the Polish–Lithuanian Commonwealth
Targowica confederates
Recipients of the Legion of Honour
Bar confederates
Polish legionnaires (Napoleonic period)
Polish male poets
Recipients of the Order of the White Eagle (Poland)
Burials at the Church of St. Adalbert, Poznań
Polish Enlightenment
19th-century Polish lawyers